Sennewald is a German surname. Notable people with the surname include:

Hans Sennewald (born 1961), German rower 
Robert W. Sennewald (born 1929), United States Army general 
Rolf Sennewald (born 1937), German weightlifter
Ulrike Sennewald (born 1989), German rower

German-language surnames